An artillery museum is a museum exhibiting the history and artifacts of artillery. In addition to actual or replica ordnance (guns, mortars, ammunition, etc.), exhibits can include photographs, maps, models, dioramas, clothing and equipment used by gunners.

Artillery museums may be owned by national, regional or local governments or entities, or by private associations. They may display their equipment only statically or in working order (e.g.: self-propelled guns).

Some museums have sets of periodicals, technical manuals, photographs and personal archives. These are often made available to researchers for use in writing articles or books, or to restoration specialists.

List of artillery museums 
 Artillerimuseet, in Kristianstad, Sweden
 The Artillery Museum of Finland, in Hämeenlinna, Finland
 The Coast Artillery Museum, in Fort Worden, United States
 Firepower: The Royal Artillery Museum, in London, England, United Kingdom
 Fort Nelson, Portsmouth, the Royal Armouries artillery collection in Hampshire, England, United Kingdom
 Military Historical Museum of Artillery, Engineers and Signal Corps, in Saint Petersburg, Russia
 Museum of Artillery, in Draguignan, France
 Australian Army Artillery Museum, Sydney, Australia
 US Army Artillery Museum, on Fort Sill, Oklahoma, USA
 Royal Canadian Artillery Museum CFB Shilo, Manitoba, Canada
 Rock Island Arsenal, Rock Island, Illinois
 American Heritage Museum, Stow, Massachusetts (Greater Boston), USA

Military and war museums
Types of museums